The Felix-Block Building is a historic two-story building in Kenner, Louisiana. It was designed in the Italianate style, and built in 1907. It has been listed on the National Register of Historic Places since July 18, 1985.

References

National Register of Historic Places in Jefferson Parish, Louisiana
Commercial buildings completed in 1907
1907 establishments in Louisiana